The name Inday has been used for six tropical cyclones in the Philippines by PAGASA in the Western Pacific Ocean.

 Typhoon Halong (2002) (T0207, 10W, Inday) – struck Japan.
 Tropical Storm Bopha (2006) (T0609, 10W, Inday) – struck Taiwan.
 Typhoon Fanapi (2010) (T1011, 12W, Inday) – struck Taiwan.
 Tropical Storm Nakri (2014) (T1412, 12W, Inday) – passed through the Ryukyu Islands and made landfall in South Korea.
 Tropical Storm Ampil (2018) (T1810, 12W, Inday)
 Typhoon Muifa (2022) (T2212, 14W, Inday) – made a strong landfall in Shanghai, China

Pacific typhoon set index articles